Partial general elections were held in the Netherlands on 12 and 26 June 1860 to elect 37 of the 72 seats in the House of Representatives.

Results

By district

Notes

References

General elections in the Netherlands
Netherlands
1860 in the Netherlands
June 1860 events
Election and referendum articles with incomplete results